Druzhne is an urban-type settlement in Yenakiieve Municipality (district) in Donetsk Oblast of eastern Ukraine. Population:

Demographics
Native language as of the Ukrainian Census of 2001:
 Ukrainian 3.59%
 Russian 96.41%

References

Urban-type settlements in Horlivka Raion